Priscagrion is a genus of flatwings in the damselfly order Odonata. There are at least two described species in Priscagrion.

As a result of molecular phylogenetic studies by Dijkstra et al. in 2013, the genus Priscagrion is considered "incertae sedis", without an assigned family but within the superfamily Calopterygoidea.

Species
These two species belong to the genus Priscagrion:
 Priscagrion kiautai Zhou & Wilson, 2001
 Priscagrion pinheyi Zhou & Wilson, 2001

References

Calopterygoidea